Zimella is a comune (municipality) in the Province of Verona in the Italian region Veneto, located about  west of Venice and about  southeast of Verona.

The municipality of Zimella contains the frazioni (subdivisions, mainly villages and hamlets) S. Stefano (capoluogo), Zimella, and Bonaldo e Volpino.

Zimella borders the following municipalities: Arcole, Cologna Veneta, Lonigo, and Veronella.

Demographic evolution

References

Cities and towns in Veneto